Nasser Hamed Paydar (born October 31, 1956) is an American academic administrator who currently serves as the Assistant Secretary of Education for Postsecondary Education. He previously served as the chancellor of Indiana University–Purdue University Indianapolis (IUPUI) from 2015 to 2022.

Early life and education
Paydar was born in Tehran, Iran. He earned bachelor's, master's, and doctoral degrees in mechanical engineering from the Syracuse University College of Engineering and Computer Science in 1979, 1981, and 1985, respectively.

Career
Paydar joined IUPUI in 1985 as an assistant professor of mechanical engineering in the School of Engineering and Technology, working in the fields of structural mechanics design, biomechanics, and electronic packaging. He held many positions in the school between 1989 and 2003, including chair of the Department and associate dean for graduate programs and academic programs.

From 2004 to 2007, he became vice-chancellor and dean of Indiana University – Purdue University Columbus (IUPUC). From 2007 to 2012, Paydar became the chancellor of Indiana University East. After this, Paydar returned to IUPUI in 2012 and  served as executive vice chancellor and chief academic officer, until his appointment as the chancellor.

On November 17, 2015, he was appointed the fifth chancellor of IUPUI as well as an executive vice president for Indiana University. After more than 36 years with the university, Paydar retired on February 28, 2022.

In March 2022, President Joe Biden nominated Paydar to serve as the assistant secretary for the Office of Postsecondary Education. He was confirmed on August 4, 2022.

Personal life
Paydar is married to Niloo who he met while they were both students at Syracuse. The couple has two adult children.

References

External links
 IUPUI Bio

1956 births
Living people
People from Tehran
20th-century American educators
21st-century American educators
20th-century American engineers
21st-century American engineers
20th-century Iranian engineers
Syracuse University College of Engineering and Computer Science alumni
Indiana University–Purdue University Indianapolis faculty
United States Department of Education officials
Biden administration personnel